Thomas Henry Armstrong (February 6, 1829 – December 29, 1891) was a Minnesota banker, lawyer, legislator, and the fifth Lieutenant Governor of Minnesota. Born in Milan, Ohio, moved to Minnesota, and became Lieutenant Governor under Governor William Rainey Marshall from January 8, 1866 to January 7, 1870. Armstrong served in the Minnesota Constitutional Convention and in both houses of the Minnesota State Legislature. He married Elizabeth M. Burgess Butman in 1868, retired, and died in 1891 in Albert Lea, Minnesota.

Notes

1829 births
1891 deaths
People from Milan, Ohio
Republican Party Minnesota state senators
Lieutenant Governors of Minnesota
Speakers of the Minnesota House of Representatives
Republican Party members of the Minnesota House of Representatives
19th-century American politicians